Princess Aura is a fictional character in the Flash Gordon comic strips and serials. She has been portrayed by various actresses in the many Flash Gordon adaptations in film and television.

Character overview
Aura is the daughter of the series' villain, Ming the Merciless, but saves Flash Gordon from her father. She soon realizes that her love for Flash is unrequited, but later falls in love with Prince Barin, the rightful heir to the throne of Mongo. She and Barin are eventually banished to the forest world of Arboria.

Appearances

Comic strips
Princess Aura first appeared in the fourth installment of the 1934 comic strip Flash Gordon. She defies her father and saves Flash, but finds that she cannot seduce him away from Dale Arden. Aura later falls in love with Prince Barin and marries him.

Film
In 1936, Princess Aura was portrayed by Priscilla Lawson in the Flash Gordon film serial. In 1940, the role was portrayed by Shirley Deane in the third Flash Gordon serial, Flash Gordon Conquers the Universe.

In 1980, Princess Aura was portrayed by Ornella Muti in the film Flash Gordon produced by Dino De Laurentiis and is shown to have numerous lovers. She saves Flash from death with the help of one of her lovers, a royal doctor who revives Flash after Ming tries executing him in a gas chamber.

Television
Melendy Britt provided the voice of Princess Aura in the 1979 Filmation animated series. She was portrayed as Ming the Merciless' daughter, who at first assists her father in battling Flash and company, but turns against him and joins the rebel forces of Mongo. She also has an elite guard of female warriors under her command known as the Witch-Women. After Ming is removed from power, the Witch-Women remain in Princess Aura's service. Princess Aura also initially resents Dale Arden and rejects Prince Barin's affections, but would become the former's friend and the latter's love interest as the series progressed. Consequently, her attraction to Flash is downplayed and does not resurface after her desertion of her father.

In the 1996 Flash Gordon animated series, Princess Aura is a sympathetic character, who often defies her father because of her attraction to Flash, or for the sake of her mother. In this version, Aura has green skin, but is otherwise perfectly human, even though her father Ming is reptilian. She is voiced by Tracey Hoyt.

Anna Van Hooft portrayed Princess Aura in the 2007 Flash Gordon television series. She is once again portrayed as a sympathetic character. Unlike the comic, she has a brother and her mother is alive. She vainly seeks her father's approval but Ming, like most other characters on the show, regards her with a mixture of pity and contempt. She also is in love with Flash and has a rivalry with Dale who looks down on her as a "royal little brat".

References

Comics characters introduced in 1934
Fictional princesses
Flash Gordon characters
Female characters in comics